Charly Mottet (born 16 December 1962 in Valence, Drôme) is a French former professional cyclist (1983 to 1994). He was one of the best French road cyclists of his era.

His daughter, Eva Mottet, was also a road racing cyclist. She competed as a junior at the 2012 UCI Road World Championships, where she heavily crashed in the women's junior road race. Charly Mottet was an UCI-official at the race. Eva would never fully recover. She died young in April 2020, aged 25.

Career

Mottet won a total of 67 races, including the Tour de Romandie in 1990, and rode eight times in the Tour de France. His best results in the Tour de France were 4th-place finishes in 1987 and 1991. He won three stages, one in 1990 (Stage 15 : Millau – Revel) and two in 1991 (Stage 11 : Quimper – Saint-Herblain and Stage 12 : Pau – Jaca).  He also finished 2nd in the 1990 Giro d'Italia.

During his professional cycling career, Mottet had a reputation within the peloton as being a totally clean rider who never used performance-enhancing drugs. 
He is former FICP World No. 1 (in May and August 1989).

After retiring from racing, Mottet became involved in race organising, working on the Critérium du Dauphiné (where he was assistant director) for 14 years, before being appointed sports manager of the Grand Prix Cycliste de Québec and Grand Prix Cycliste de Montréal in 2010. He also served as selector for the French national cycling team at the 1997 and 1998 Road World Championships, and as a technical delegate for the Union Cycliste Internationale at the 2004 and 2008 Summer Olympics.

Career achievements

Major results

1982
 2nd Paris–Troyes
1983
 2nd Overall Tour de Luxembourg
1st Stage 1
 2nd Overall Route du Sud
1st Stage 2
 5th Overall Tour du Vaucluse
 6th Overall Tour de l'Avenir
1984
 1st  Overall Tour de l'Avenir
1st Stage 7
 1st  Young rider classification Giro d'Italia
 1st Liedekerkse Pijl
 1st Stage 5 Clásico RCN
 2nd Paris–Brussels
 6th Grand Prix de Cannes
 9th Overall Tour de Romandie
1985
 1st Overall Tour du Haut Var
 1st Grand Prix d'Ouverture La Marseillaise
 1st Grand Prix des Nations
 1st Giro del Piemonte
 1st Duo Normand (with Thierry Marie)
 1st Stages 9 & 11 Tour de l'Avenir
 2nd Overall Paris–Bourges
 3rd Firenze–Pistoia
 5th Overall Critérium International
 6th Overall Étoile de Bessèges
1st Stage 3
 8th Overall Tour du Limousin
 9th Overall Paris–Nice
1st Stage 7a
1986
 1st Stages 9 & 11 Vuelta a España
 1st Grand Prix Eddy Merckx
 1st Breuillet
 1st Stage 2 Tour du Vaucluse
 2nd  Road race, UCI Road World Championships
 2nd Overall Route du Sud
1st Stage 1
 2nd Firenze–Pistoia
 3rd Overall Volta a Catalunya
 3rd Paris–Tours
 4th Overall Critérium International
 4th Grand Prix des Nations
 9th Overall Paris–Nice
 10th La Flèche Wallonne
1987
 1st  Overall Critérium du Dauphiné Libéré
 1st Six-Days of Grenoble (with Bernard Vallet)
 1st Overall Tour du Limousin
1st Stage 1
 1st Châteauroux–Limoges
 1st Critérium des As
 1st Grand Prix des Nations
 1st GP de Vannes
 1st Montreuil
 1st Quilan
 3rd Overall Four Days of Dunkirk
 3rd GP Eddy Merckx
 4th Overall Tour de France
 4th Paris–Tours
 9th Giro di Lombardia
1988
 1st Giro di Lombardia
 1st Overall Six-Days of Grenoble (with Roman Hermann)
 1st Giro del Lazio
 1st Grand Prix des Nations
 1st Overall Tour du Vaucluse
1st Stage 2b
 2nd Overall Four Days of Dunkirk
1st Stage 6a (ITT)
 2nd GP Ouest–France
 2nd Overall Paris–Bourges
1st Stage 2
 2nd Overall Tour Méditerranéen
 3rd Overall Critérium du Dauphiné Libéré
1st Stage 3
 3rd Overall Euskal Bizikleta
 3rd Trofeo Baracchi
 3rd Grand Prix de Wallonie
 4th La Flèche Wallonne
 5th Overall Ronde van Nederland
 7th Tour of Flanders
 7th Liège–Bastogne–Liège
 8th GP Eddy Merckx
 10th Trophée des Grimpeurs
1989
 1st  Overall Critérium du Dauphiné Libéré
1st Stage 3
 1st Overall Four Days of Dunkirk
1st Stage 3b
 1st Overall Six Days of Paris (with Etienne De Wilde)
 1st Boucles de l'Aulne
 1st Giro del Lazio
 1st Châteaulin
 1st Stage 3 Tour d'Armorique
 2nd Overall Tour of Ireland
 2nd Overall Critérium International
 2nd Tre Valli Varesine
 3rd Overall Tirreno–Adriatico
1st Stage 6
 3rd Overall Vuelta a la Comunidad Valenciana
 3rd GP des Amériques
 3rd Grand Prix des Nations
 4th Clásica de San Sebastián
 4th Overall Grand Prix du Midi-Libre
1st Prologue
 6th Overall Tour de France
 7th Trophée des Grimpeurs
 10th Overall Driedaagse van De Panne-Koksijde
1990
 1st Stage 15 Tour de France
 1st  Overall Tour de Romandie
1st Prologue & Stage 3b
 1st Züri-Metzgete
 2nd Overall Giro d'Italia
1st Stage 16
 5th Overall Tour Méditerranéen
 5th 
 6th Trofeo Baracchi
1991
 1st Overall Four Days of Dunkirk
 1st Classique des Alpes
 1st Stage 2 Tour d'Armorique
 2nd Coppa Ugo Agostoni
 3rd Overall Critérium International
1st Stage 2
 3rd Giro dell'Emilia
 4th Overall Tour de France
1st Stages 11 & 12
 5th Overall Vuelta a Andalucía
 6th Trophée des Grimpeurs
 9th Trofeo Luis Puig
 10th Clásica de San Sebastián
1992
 1st  Overall Critérium du Dauphiné Libéré
1st Stage 8
 1st Coppa Bernocchi
 3rd Overall Tour de Romandie
 5th Trophée des Grimpeurs
 8th Overall Volta a Catalunya
 10th Overall Paris–Nice
1993
 1st Overall Tour du Limousin
1st Stage 4b
 1st Overall Tour Méditerranéen
1st Stage 3
 2nd Züri-Metzgete
 3rd Overall Étoile de Bessèges
 4th Grand Prix d'Ouverture La Marseillaise
 5th Giro di Lombardia
1994
 1st Stage 7 Paris–Nice
 2nd Paris–Camembert
 3rd Overall Route du Sud
 5th Overall Tour Méditerranéen
 5th Grand Prix des Nations
 8th Overall Étoile de Bessèges

Grand Tour general classification results timeline

References

External links 

Official Tour de France results for Charly Mottet

1962 births
Living people
Sportspeople from Valence, Drôme
French male cyclists
French Tour de France stage winners
French Giro d'Italia stage winners
French Vuelta a España stage winners
Cyclists from Auvergne-Rhône-Alpes